Gulam S. "Boy" Salliman-Hataman is a Filipino politician and brother to Hadjiman S. Hataman-Salliman and Mujiv Sabbihi Hataman.

Background
His two brothers are also influential politicians; Mujiv Hataman is the party-list representative of Anak Mindanao in the House of Representatives (2001–present), and Hadjiman "Jim" Hataman is the representative from the lone district of Basilan.

Political Activities
Boy served as mayor of Sumisip from 2004 to 2007, but lost re-election to rival Haber Asarul.  Boy ran in 2010 but again lost to Asarul.

References

Mayors of places in Basilan
Living people
Lakas–CMD politicians
Filipino Muslims
Year of birth missing (living people)